The 1923 Louisville Brecks season was their third season in the league and final season as the Brecks. The team failed to improve on their previous output of 1–3, losing all their games. They tied for nineteenth place in the league.

Schedule

Standings

References

Louisville Brecks and Colonels (NFL) seasons
Louisville Brecks
Louisville Brecks
National Football League winless seasons